The Laureus World Sports Award for Sportsperson of the Year with a Disability is an annual award honouring the achievements of individual disabled athletes from the world of Paralympic sports. It was first awarded in 2000 as one of the seven constituent awards presented during the Laureus World Sports Awards. The awards are presented by the Laureus Sport for Good Foundation, a global organisation involved in more than 150 charity projects supporting 500,000 young people. The first ceremony was held on 25 May 2000 in Monte Carlo, at which Nelson Mandela gave the keynote speech. Nominations for the award come from a specialist panel. The Laureus World Sports Academy then selects the winner who is presented with a Laureus statuette, created by Cartier, at an annual awards ceremony held in various locations around the world. The awards are considered highly prestigious and are frequently referred to as the sporting equivalent of "Oscars".

The first winner of the award was the Australian wheelchair racer, Louise Sauvage, who had won three medals at the 2000 Sydney Paralympics. In 2002, Esther Vergeer, a Dutch wheelchair tennis player, was selected as the award winner. Described as the "most dominant athlete in the world", Vergeer won 470 matches in a row during her career, collecting 284 titles, including 21 grand slam singles titles and 23 grand slam doubles titles. She is one of two people to have won the Sportsperson of the Year with a Disability award more than once, winning again in 2008; she was also nominated in 2006, 2007, 2011 and 2012. The Brazilian swimmer Daniel Dias has the most wins, collecting the award three times with a further three nominations, while German racing cyclist Michael Teuber has been nominated the most times (four) without winning. The 2004 winner, Canadian sprinter Earle Connor, had his award and his 2002 nomination rescinded after he failed a drugs test. Athletes have been the most successful at the awards with 6 wins and 28 nominations (excluding Connor's results), followed by swimmers with 4 wins and 19 nominations.  The winner of the 2020 Laureus World Sports Award for Sportsperson of the Year with a Disability was the Ukrainian-born American Paralympic cross-country skier Oksana Masters.  The award was not presented in the 2021 ceremony.

List of winners and nominees

Statistics
Statistics are correct as of 2020 ceremony.

See also
 Best Female Athlete with a Disability ESPY Award
 Best Male Athlete with a Disability ESPY Award
 Paralympic Games

References

Disability
Disabled sports awards
Awards established in 2000